Atrichum undulatum is a species of mosses belonging to the family Polytrichaceae.

It is native to Eurasia and North America.

References

Polytrichaceae